Nigel Humphreys (born 1951 in Bognor Regis, Sussex) is a British actor who is best known for his television work.

His most prominent roles include Dickie Fleming in Coronation Street and PC Pete Dodds in Softly, Softly: Taskforce.

Other television credits include: Dixon of Dock Green, Z-Cars, The Expert, Warship, The Sweeney, Blake's 7, The Professionals, Minder, The Gentle Touch, Doctor Who (in the serial Warriors of the Deep), All in Good Faith, Pulaski, No Job for a Lady, The Bill and Birds of a Feather. His film credits include Danny Jones (1972), Joseph Andrews (1977), Scum (1979), The Great Riviera Bank Robbery (1979), The Long Good Friday (1980), Breaking Glass (1980), Who Dares Wins (1982) and Lamb (1985).

Filmography

External links
 

British male television actors
1951 births
Living people
People from Bognor Regis